Dragons of Triumph is the fourth and final module in the third story arc of the 14-module Dragonlance (DL) series of the Dungeons & Dragons adventure role-playing game. The series was published by TSR between 1984 and 1986. The game's cover art work by Clyde Caldwell features Laurana Kanan chained on a platform before the goddess of evil, Takhisis.

Plot synopsis
Dragons of Triumph is both a scenario and the title of a sourcebook. The sourcebook describes the continent of Ansalon, including its status before and after the war, and all of the draconians, creatures, and artifacts of Krynn. In the scenario, the player characters cross a land of smoke and fire to reach the capital of the Dragon Empire in order to confront the Dragon Queen for a final battle between good and evil. In this final battle with Takhisis at her temple in Neraka, the Heroes of the Lance must drive her back to her own plane. Battlesystem statistics are provided to enable the battle.

Contents
The cover of the adventure contains a combined list of monster statistics, as well as the character details for the two Dragonlance parties, which were split in DL6 Dragons of Ice, and details for the extra characters who have joined the parties since then; the players get to choose which characters they want to use from the two groups.

The module is split into three sections: two booklets and a sourcebook. The first booklet gives background details about Krynn, with a comprehensive timeline stretching from the beginning of the age of dreams to the end of the War of the Lance. Also included are two maps of Ansalon, one showing the continent before the Cataclysm and another giving the distribution of creatures throughout Ansalon after the events of the war. The second map can be used in conjunction with other details given about the continent and the factions left after the war to plan further adventures in the land of Krynn. Also included in the source book are descriptions of the creatures specific to Krynn and the most powerful magical items encountered by the characters during the modules.

The second booklet contains the maps needed to run the adventure. Some of the maps have to be taken apart to be easily used. The maps are interspersed with rosters for the whitestone and dragon armies for use with the Battlesystem rules. If Battlesystem is being used, all necessary details are included in order to allow the rest of the characters to help lead forces of the whitestone armies against the combined might of the white, green, black, blue, and red Dragon armies. Multiple ways to defeat the Dark Queen are given so that each Dungeon Master (DM) can choose the one that best fits the campaign. This also gives DMs the chance to present any players who have read the novels with a different and more challenging adventure.

Publication history
The module DL14 Dragons of Triumph was written by Douglas Niles and published by TSR in 1986. Clyde Caldwell illustrated the cover, and Diana Magnuson, Larry Elmore, and Jeff Easley illustrated the remaining parts of the game set. The module consists of a 40-page book, a 32-page book, a 24-page sourcebook, a large color map of the world, and an outer folder.

Reception
John S. Davies reviewed Dragons of Triumph for the British magazine Adventurer #7 (February 1987). He commented on the placement of the maps, writing, "It is handy having the maps in a separate book, and not having to flick backwards and forwards, or having to consult a large map like that presented for the tower of the high clerist." He noted that, as with the other Dragonlance modules, "Dragons of Triumph can be played alone, but is better played as the final part of the Dragonlance saga." He concluded, "When DL1 was released, it showed a lot of promise as a truly epic series, which unfortunately, some of the latter adventure packs have not lived up to. DL14, however, was well worth waiting for. It brings the heroes' quests to a culmination in a final battle against time and the Dark Queen, which could give any party a real challenge."

References

Dragonlance adventures
Role-playing game supplements introduced in 1986